Tehran Contemporary Music Festival (TCMF) is the premiere contemporary music festival in Iran and it has been regarded as an influential Contemporary musical event in Iran, and gradually become one of the most important new music festivals in the Middle East area.

The festival usually takes place during the time of one week in April–June period (depending on the calendar of Islamic feasts) and is staged at venues all around Tehran. The events are staged both in large, established venues such as Roudaki Hall and the Tehran Museum of Contemporary Art as well as in small Galleries, Cultural Places, industrial premises and Public Places.

TCMF promotes new music, new musicians, and international artistic and cultural collaborations.

Background 

The thoughts of creating a festival devoted to popularization of contemporary music in Iran started in 2014 by Navid Gohari (the artistic director of the Festival) and Ehsan Tarokh (the executive director of the Festival) through their collaboration with Iranian composer Idin Samimi Mofakham and Polish composer Martyna Kosecka. In 2015, the first executive steps were taken under the consultation and planning of Hosein Sarvi (advisor of international affairs and planning consultant) and with the collaboration and support of the Music Office of the Ministry of Culture and Islamic Guidance, Roudaki Foundation, Tehran Museum of Contemporary Art and the Iranian Artists' Forum. Along with the establishment of Contemporary Music Circle in the Museum of Contemporary Art (CMC.TMOCA) by Navid Gohari as the director of the circle, the idea of holding 'Tehran International Festival of Contemporary Music' began to come alive.

In the fall of 2015, the Academic and artistic council of the Festival was formed with the cooperation of Hamidreza Ardalan (scientific adviser), Idin Samimi Mofakham, Martyna Kosecka (artistic advisers). Announcing the call and inviting foreign groups with the collaboration of Spectro Centre for New Music, executive paces were made afterwards to organize the First International Festival of Tehran Contemporary Music.

Program 

The program of each festival edition varies depending on the presented content.

TCMF aims towards the interest of music students and passionate proponents of new music by arranging lectures, workshops and masterclasses during the whole-week festival period. Concerts during Tehran Contemporary Music Festival are generally divided into two category cycles. The core of activities lies in acoustic events such as concerts with various orchestras, ensembles, choirs and soloists from Iran and abroad. The other group of activities focuses on electroacoustic and experimental music, where TCMF programs live electronic and electroacoustic music concerts, fixed media concerts, sound installations and free improvisation sessions.

Venues

Vahdat Hall 

Vahdat Hall is one of Iran's most equipped and spacious opera, ballet, music, and musical theater hall, com¬missioned by the former ministry of culture and art was built over 10 years by Yugita Aftandelianc based on the Vienna Opera Hall sample, and is named after the great Iranian poet and musician Abu Abdullah Roudaki. The hall was opened in 1967 with the best interior designing and unique light and sound machinery equipment.

Roudaki foundation building consisted of two halls ran under the names Roudaki Hall and Small Hall, after the Islamic Revolution of Iran, the larger hall was changed, to Vahdat Hall and the smaller hall Was changed to Roudaki Hall. After the Islamic Revolution these mostly host music concerts and theatrical performances.

Roudaki Hall 

This hall includes the main hall on the third floor and balcony on the fourth floor which initially had the total capacity of 250 people. Roudaki Hall proved stage is fixed and is designed just for the orchestra rehearsal and performing music groups. The end of the stage is made for implementation of Orchestra and Choir group. Roudaki Hall in December 2009 was equipped with lighting system under license of ADB Company and sound, of DYNACORD (POWEMATE1600)

The process of repair and equipment of Roudaki Hall started on January 6, 2011. The equipment included installing cameras for recording performances, lighting bridge for lighting system improvement, the program starting alarm, a complete painting of the hall and its balcony, new flooring for the hall, backstage and waiting rooms, installing a new acoustic system in the hall, a portable screen and a video projection unit.

Roudaki is one of the few halls which have been built acoustically and due to 81 sound reflectors mounted on the ceiling, there is no need to use a microphone for performances. Yamaha speakers, Dynacord mixer, 30 wired and wireless microphones and recorders which allow recording the performances simultaneously altogether form a complete sound system. Roudaki Hall has hosted different traditional and classic music and Orchestra performances. Different concerts of music bands, including contemporary, modern, traditional, integrative, piano recitals, violin, pipe, classic Guitar, chamber orchestra, Philharmonic Choir, ensemble concerts and other musical performances have been performed on the stage in Roudaki Hall.

Tehran Museum of Contemporary Art 

Tehran Museum of Contemporary Art, also known as TMOCA, is among the largest art museums in Iran. It has collections of more than 3000 items that include 19th and 20th century's world-class European and American paintings, prints, drawings and sculptures. TMoCA also has one of the greatest collections of Iranian modern and contemporary art. TMoCA is considered to have the most valuable collections of modern Western masterpieces outside Europe and North America.

The museum was designed by Iranian architect Kamran Diba, who employed elements from traditional Persian architecture. It was built adjacent to Laleh Park, Tehran, and was inaugurated in 1977. The building itself can be regarded as an example of contemporary art, in a style of an underground New York Guggenheim Museum.

Most of the museum area is located underground with a circular walkway that spirals downwards with galleries branching outwards. Western sculptures by artists such as Ernst, Giacometti, Magritte and Moore can be found in the museum's gardens.

Festival Orchestra 
“Nilper in ancient Iranian language means “Lotus” and it’s a symbol for peace and friendship in opinion of all countries.”

Nilper Orchestra was founded by Navid Gohari in 2004 for performing Contemporary Classical Music. The Orchestra's continuous aspiration is performing art music of both Iranian and international contemporary composers, while – as the members of the orchestra – bringing together talented performers and rising artists living and working in Iran. Since its establishment, the orchestra has performed regularly in seasonal programming, and in its 13th years of activity has performed 28 full concerts, performing 58 works in repertoire of contemporary music, 23 world or national premieres, and has hosted 10 soloists. Since 2008 Ehsan Tarokh has been responsible for orchestra's managerial activities. Nilper is focused on introducing and performing the rarity repertoire of high quality, observing international rules of Copyright and interaction with publishing houses, and invitation and hosting of established artists and soloists from around the world. These all mark the concept, philosophy, and the approach of the board of directors in Nilper Orchestra.

See also 
Roudaki Hall
Tehran Museum of Contemporary Art
Vahdat Hall

External links
TCMF Official website
Nilper Orchestra Official website
Tehran Museum of Contemporary art

References

Contemporary classical music festivals
Music festivals in Iran
Spring (season) events in Iran